Infinite Rider on the Big Dogma (or simply, Infinite Rider) is Michael Nesmith's ninth post-Monkees studio album and the third studio album from his own company, Pacific Arts Records & Tapes.  To continue developing Pacific Arts' multimedia projects, Nesmith originally developed the album as a "video album" (however, to date, Infinite Rider has only been released as a music album). It peaked at No. 151 on the Billboard Pop albums charts.  The album was well received with both "Crusin" and "Factions" garnering significant airplay during July and August 1979 on Album Oriented Rock radio stations.

Each track on Infinite Rider has only one word in its title.  Yet, on the LP and unique inner sleeve, Nesmith listed each song with a parenthetical subtitle for each track.

Although the album was never released on video, Nesmith has released the album on compact disc.  Several songs from the album have been produced as music videos, however, which were featured in Nesmith's Elephant Parts "video album".

Promotional materials
To promote the release of Infinite Rider, Pacific Arts released a promotional album entitled "The Michael Nesmith Radio Special".  The promotional album intertwines an interview with Nesmith and the anticipated slate of songs for his then-forthcoming album.

Track listing
All songs written by Michael Nesmith except "Capsule," which was written by Michael Nesmith, Al Perkins, David Mackay, Paul Leim, John Hobbs and Lenny Castro.

Tracks
 "Dance" – 2:32
 "Magic" – 3:42
 "Tonite" – 3:56
 "Flying" – 4:46 (long version - 6:56)
 "Carioca" – 4:06
 "Cruisin'" – 3:51
 "Factions" – 3:24
 "Light" – 3:21
 "Horserace" – 3:21
 "Capsule" – 5:16

Parenthetical Titles
 "Dance (Dance & Have a Good Time)" – 2:32
 "Magic (This Night Is Magic)" – 3:42
 "Tonite (The Television Song)" – 3:56
 "Flying (Silks & Satins)" – 4:46 (long version - 6:56)
 "Carioca (Blue Carioca)" – 4:06
 "Cruisin' (Lucy and Ramona and Sunset Sam)" – 3:51
 "Factions (The Daughter of Rock n' Roll)" – 3:24
 "Light (The Eclectic Light)" – 3:21
 "Horserace (Beauty and Magnum Force)" – 3:21
 "Capsule (Hello People a Hundred Years from Now)" – 5:16

 
Bonus tracks only available for download on Michael Nesmith's Videoranch:

"Walkin' in the Sand" - 3:09
"Rollin'" - 3:30

Music videos
The following videos were produced from Infinite Rider:
Magic
Tonight
Carioca
Cruisin'
Light

Personnel
Michael Nesmith - rhythm and lead guitars, vocals, producer, arranger
Joe Chemay - arranger, vocals
William Bottrell - engineer, mixing assistant
Lenny Castro - percussion
John Hobbs - keyboards, vocals
Paul Leim - drums
David MacKay - bass
Al Perkins - lead and slide guitars
Tom Saviano - saxophone
Technical
Tom Trefethen - engineer, mixing
Charles Bush - photography
Jerry Takigawa - art direction, design, hand tinting

References

1979 albums
Michael Nesmith albums